Janam Sakshi is a registered Telugu language newspaper in the Indian State of Telangana. It is published simultaneously from Hyderabad and Karimnagar.The paper is also available in epaper format.M.M.Rahman Editor janamsakshi. Empanalled big daily newspapers category in I &pr telanngana state government.

External links
Janam Sakshi Website
Janam Sakshi ePaper

Daily newspapers published in India
Telugu-language newspapers
Newspapers published in Hyderabad
Publications established in 2002
2002 establishments in Andhra Pradesh